Disenchantment is an American fantasy animated sitcom created by Matt Groening for Netflix, who also created Futurama and The Simpsons for Fox Broadcasting Company. Disenchantment, being animated, features a multitude of characters including Princess Bean (Abbi Jacobson), Elfo (Nat Faxon), and Luci (Eric Andre), and consists of one season (split into two parts) that was released on August 17, 2018, and September 20, 2019. Each of the first two parts consisted of 10 episodes. A 10-episode third part, the first of the second season, was released on January 15, 2021. A fourth part was released on February 9, 2022.

Series overview

Episodes

Part 1 (2018)

Part 2 (2019)

Part 3 (2021)

Part 4 (2022)

References 

Lists of American adult animated television series episodes
Lists of American sitcom episodes